Indira Vizcaíno Silva (born 14 January 1987) is a Mexican politician from the Morena party. From 2009 to 2012 she served as Deputy of the LXI Legislature of the Mexican Congress representing Colima. In 2021, she became the second female Governor of Colima after Griselda Álvarez, as well as the first non-PRI governor of the state in over 90 years.

The daughter of former politician Arnoldo Vizcaíno, she was born in Tijuana while her father worked in the city but grew up in Colima.

References

1987 births
Living people
Women members of the Chamber of Deputies (Mexico)
Deputies of the LXIV Legislature of Mexico
Municipal presidents in Colima
Party of the Democratic Revolution politicians
University of Colima alumni
21st-century Mexican politicians
21st-century Mexican women politicians
Politicians from Colima
Politicians from Tijuana
Deputies of the LXI Legislature of Mexico
Members of the Chamber of Deputies (Mexico) for Colima
Governors of Colima